George Hairston (September 20, 1750 – March 5, 1825) was a noted planter and politician in Virginia. He was a Colonel in the American Revolutionary War and a Brigadier General in the War of 1812.

Family life
George Hairston was the son of Robert Hairston and his wife, Ruth Stovall Hairston, and was born on September 20, 1750, at their home of Marrowbone plantation in Bedford County, Virginia, (which latter became part of Henry County, Virginia). In 1776, George Hairston built Beaver Creek Plantation, which remained his home. In 1790, George Hairston and James Anthony donated fifty acres of land for a courthouse and public buildings, which later became the center of Martinsville, Virginia.

He married Elizabeth Perkins Letcher on January 1, 1781, and they had twelve children. Elizabeth Letcher was the widow of Captain William Letcher of Laurel Hill Farm, who was killed by Tories in front of his wife in 1780. Their children were: Robert HAIRSTON b. 1 Apr 1783, d. 7 Mar 1852; Col. George "Old Rusty" HAIRSTON Jr.+ b. 27 Nov 1784, d. 13 Oct 1863; Harden HAIRSTON+ b. 23 Oct 1786, d. 23 Oct 1862; Lt. Samuel HAIRSTON+ b. 19 Nov 1788, d. 2 Mar 1875; Nicholas Perkins HAIRSTON b. 18 Oct 1791, d. 1824; Henry HAIRSTON b. 23 Jul 1793, d. 1825; Peter HAIRSTON b. 16 Jan 1796, d. 28 Oct 1810; Constantine HAIRSTON b. 17 Dec 1797, d. 12 Feb 1819; John Adams HAIRSTON+ b. 15 Mar 1799, d. 7 Sep 1849; America HAIRSTON+ b. 21 Feb 1801, d. 16 Mar 1826; Marshall HAIRSTON+ b. 4 Jul 1802, d. 20 Jan 1882 and Ruth Stovall HAIRSTON+ b. 6 Sep 1804, d. 20 Sep 1838.

Through his mother, George was the fourth-great-grandson of Christopher Newport and a distant cousin of Illiam Dhone and Fletcher Christian.

Revolutionary War
He was the captain of a company of Col. Abram Penn that, in March 1781, hurried from Beaver Creek Plantation to the assistance of Gen. Nathanael Greene at the Battle of Guilford Court House near Greensboro, NC.

In "The Architectural Survey of Henry County", it states: "George Hairston established his Beaver Creek plantation around 1776. The next year he received appointment as a Henry County militia captain at the first meeting of the county court. He served as third captain under Major Waller at the Battle of Guilford Courthouse, and again joined Waller at the British surrender at Yorktown. During the 1780s he purchased and sold numerous tracts of land and worked his tobacco plantation with 29 slaves. In June 1791 George Hairston and James Anthony gave Henry County 50 acres adjacent to the courthouse, the tract that the Virginia General Assembly established as the town of Martinsville, Virginia, in December 1791."

War of 1812
He served as a brigadier general in the War of 1812, commanding the 3rd, 4th, 5th & 6th Virginia and the 85th North Carolina (a colonel in NC) regiments. He saw much service and was in the engagement that repulsed Robert Ross (British Army officer) who burned Washington DC and was killed at the Battle of Bladensburg.

Death and burial
He died on March 5, 1825, at his home, Beaver Creek Plantation, in Henry County. He is buried at the Hairston Family Cemetery-Beaver Creek Plantation Henry County Virginia. George left a will written on 7 March 1820. His estate was probated on 9 April 1827.

References

Bibliography
 DeMark, Susan. 1979. "Hairstons: A Family, a Corporation". Burlington County Times. 
 "Col. George Hairston’s Obituary" The Richmond Enquirer. April 10, 1827.
 "George Hairston Order-Books, 1813-1814." Abstract: George Hairston was a captain in the American Revolution and an acting brigadier general during the War of 1812. The collection includes general orders and brigade orders, court martial proceedings, muster rolls, morning reports, and other records of the 4th, 5th, and 6th regiments of Virginia militia under Hairston in the service of the United States at and near Norfolk, Va. 
 Hairston Family Bible Record. 1750. Summary: Area covered is Henry County, Virginia. Other surnames mentioned: Saunders and Wilson. 
 Hairston, Elizabeth Seawell Hairston. The Hairstons and Penns and Their Relations. Roanoke, Va: [publisher not identified], 1940. 
 Hairston, Peter W. The Stories of Beaver Creek: As Gleaned from Family Letters and Records. [United States]: P. Hairston, 2003. 
 Harris, John B. Peter Hairston the Immigrant. [Henry County, VA]: J.B. Harris, 2002. 82 leaves: chiefly facsimiles; 28 cm.
 Records of Ante-bellum Southern Plantations from the Revolution Through the Civil War: Hairston and Wilson families. Kenneth Milton Stampp, Martin Paul Schipper, University of North Carolina at Chapel Hill. Library. Southern Historical Collection. 1993.
 Wiencek, Henry. The Hairstons: An American Family in Black and White. New York: St. Martin's Press, 1999.

People from Henry County, Virginia
Virginia militiamen in the American Revolution
American militiamen in the War of 1812
American planters
1750 births
1825 deaths
Virginia colonial people
American slave owners
American militia generals